David Parsons (born 26 December 1967 in Birmingham, Warwickshire) has been the England and Wales Cricket Board's National Spin Bowling Coach since 27 January 2006.

Parsons attended King Edward VI Five Ways Grammar School for Boys at Bartley Green in Birmingham, where he performed well at cricket and long distance running. His school nickname was Doive, in honour of an accent so thick it was almost impenetrable, even to other Brummies.

On 6 December 2007 Parsons was appointed ECB Performance Director replacing Peter Moores who was promoted to the role of England head coach.

Parsons implemented the inaugural ECB Spin Bowling Programme and has taken advice from Terry Jenner the man credited with the development of Shane Warne. He also visited the World Cricket Academy in Mumbai.

During the 2007 season Parsons organised two "Spin Camps" where young spin bowlers attended training sessions at the ECB Performance Centre in Loughborough. This involved spin bowling coaches developing the young bowlers whilst allowing young batsmen to face the spin bowlers and gain experience playing against them.

References

External links
David Parsons at ESPNcricinfo

English cricket coaches
1967 births
Living people
People educated at King Edward VI Five Ways